D. B. Gurung was an inimitable poet, novelist and essayist from Nepal. He wrote in English Language. His essays speak with power and freshness about the turbulent history of Nepal that we have been experiencing over a decade. His notable book is the Echoes of the Himalayas.

Bibliography
Echoes of the Himalayas
Breaking Twilight (Mahaveer Publishers, New Delhi) (2013)
Whispers Poems (1992)

References

Nepalese male novelists
Living people
Year of birth missing (living people)
Place of birth missing (living people)
Gurung people